
Gmina Janowice Wielkie is a rural gmina (administrative district) in Jelenia Góra County, Lower Silesian Voivodeship, in south-western Poland.

Neighbouring gminas
Gmina Janowice Wielkie is bordered by the towns of Jelenia Góra and Wojcieszów and the gminas of Bolków, Jeżów Sudecki, Kamienna Góra, Marciszów, Mysłakowice and Świerzawa.

Villages
The gmina contains the villages of Janowice Wielkie, Komarno, Miedzianka, Mniszków, Radomierz and Trzcińsko.

Twin towns – sister cities

Gmina Janowice Wielkie is twinned with:
 Bruchhausen-Vilsen, Germany
 Rádlo, Czech Republic

References

Janowice Wielkie
Karkonosze County